The following is a list of military bases in Honduras and of the Military of Honduras:

Air Bases
Operated by the Honduran Air Force:
Base Aerea Coronel Hector Caraccioli Moncada in La Ceiba
Base Aerea Coronel Hernan Acosta Mejia in Tegucigalpa
Base Aerea Coronel Armando Escalon Espinal in Valle de Sula
Operated joint with USAF:
Base Aerea Soto Cano in Comayagua

Land Bases
101 Brigada in Choluteca
105 Brigada in San Pedro Sula
110 Brigada in Danlí
115 Brigada in Juticalpa
120 Brigada in Santa Rosa de Copán

Naval Bases
Base Naval Caratasca
Base Naval Puerto Cortés
Base Naval Puerto Castilla
Base Naval Amapala

Military of Honduras
Military bases